Jeffrey Allan Ware (born November 11, 1970) is an American former professional baseball pitcher who currently serves as the bullpen coach for the Toronto Blue Jays of Major League Baseball (MLB). He also played in parts of two seasons with the Blue Jays in 1995 and 1996.

Ware attended First Colonial High School in Virginia Beach, Virginia, and Old Dominion University, where he played college baseball for the Old Dominion Monarchs.

During his time in the minor leagues with the Knoxville Smokies, Michael Jordan hit one of his three career home runs off of him. In early 2015, he was named as the pitching coach for the Class-A Lansing Lugnuts. In 2021, Ware was appointed to serve as the Triple-A Buffalo Bisons pitching coach. On July 13, 2022, Ware was promoted by the Blue Jays to interim manager of the Bisons, after Casey Candaele was promoted to interim bench coach of the Blue Jays following the firing of Charlie Montoyo. On July 29, Ware was appointed interim manager of the Bisons for the rest of the season.

On January 31, 2023, Ware was named as the new bullpen coach for the Toronto Blue Jays.

References

External links
, or Pelota Binaria (Venezuelan Winter League)

1970 births
Living people
Aberdeen Arsenal players
American expatriate baseball players in Canada
Atlantic City Surf players
Baseball players from Norfolk, Virginia
Buffalo Bisons (minor league) managers
Cardenales de Lara players
American expatriate baseball players in Venezuela
Dunedin Blue Jays players
Jackson Senators players
Knoxville Smokies players
Major League Baseball pitchers
Old Dominion Monarchs baseball players
Syracuse Chiefs players
Toronto Blue Jays players
Tucson Toros players
Tyler Roughnecks players
Pan American Games medalists in baseball
Pan American Games bronze medalists for the United States
Baseball players at the 1991 Pan American Games
Medalists at the 1991 Pan American Games